Dubovoy is a surname mainly of Russian and or Ukrainian origin. Notable people with the surname include:

Ivan Dubovoy (1900–1981), Soviet Army major general
Oleksandr Dubovoy (1976), Ukrainian politician
Vladislav Dubovoy (1989), Russian professional footballer
Ivan Naumovich Dubovoy (1896–1938), Ukrainian Soviet army commander

See also
Dubovoy, a rural locality (a khutor) in Boldyrevskoye Rural Settlement, Ostrogozhsky District, Voronezh Oblast, Russia